The Baltic Men Volleyball League, known as the Credit24 Champions League for sponsorship reasons, is the top official competition for men's volleyball clubs in the Baltic states.

History
 Schenker League (2005–2015)
 League of Hundred (2015–2016)
 Credit24 Champions League (2016–present)

Clubs
The following 10 clubs are competing in the Baltic Men Volleyball League during the 2021–22 season.

Finals

Titles by club

Titles by country

MVP by edition
 2012–13 –  Mart Tiisaar
 2013–14 –  Hindrek Pulk
 2014–15 –  Robert Täht
 2015–16 –  Hindrek Pulk 
 2016–17 –  Siim Põlluäär
 2017–18 –  Hindrek Pulk 
 2018–19 –  Hindrek Pulk 
 2020–21 –  Renee Teppan
 2021–22 –  Kert Toobal
 2022–23 –  Timo Lõhmus

See also
Baltic Women's Volleyball League

References

External links
Official website 
Page at the Latvian Volleyball Federation website (in Latvian/English)
Page at the Estonian Volleyball Federation website  (in Estonian)

 
Men's volleyball leagues
Volleyball leagues in Estonia
Volleyball leagues in Latvia
Volleyball leagues in Lithuania
Sport in the Baltic states
European men's volleyball club competitions
Sports leagues established in 2005
2005 establishments in Europe
Multi-national professional sports leagues